Patrick S. Grossi (born October 31, 1942) was a Republican member of the Illinois House of Representatives from 1979 to 1983.

Biographical sketch
Patrick S. Grossi was born October 31, 1942 in Chicago Heights, Illinois. He earned a Bachelor of Arts in history from Northern Illinois University and a juris doctor from Chicago-Kent College of Law. Grossi was admitted to the bar in 1972. He served as the city attorney for Chicago Heights until his election to the Illinois House. At one point in time, Grossi was a member of the United States Army.

In the 1978 general election, Grossi was elected to the Illinois House of Representatives alongside Robert J. Piel and L. Michael Getty. Grossi and Piel, the Republican ticket, defeated Democratic incumbent John Matejek. He resided in Glenwood at the time of his legislative service.

Grossi joined the bench as an associate judge for the Circuit Court of Cook County in 1984. He was elected a circuit judge in 1986. After the retirement of Sheila Murphy, Grossi was appointed the interim presiding judge of Cook County Circuit Court's Sixth Municipal District in Markham, Illinois. Grossi retired from the bench on July 8, 2003.

References

Living people
Republican Party members of the Illinois House of Representatives
Illinois lawyers
1942 births
Northern Illinois University alumni
People from Chicago Heights, Illinois
20th-century American politicians
Chicago-Kent College of Law alumni
Judges of the Circuit Court of Cook County